Smoke Camp Wildlife Management Area is located on 252 acres (102 ha) northwest of Weston in Lewis County, West Virginia.

See also
Conservation biology
Fishing
Hunting
List of West Virginia wildlife management areas

References

External links
West Virginia DNR District 3 Wildlife Management Areas

Wildlife management areas of West Virginia
Protected areas of Lewis County, West Virginia
IUCN Category V